Saw You Drown is an extended play released by Katatonia in 1998, limited to 1500 handnumbered copies. In 2005, it was re-issued on clear/blue wax 10" LP in 1000 hand-numbered copies.

The first two tracks are previews of the then-upcoming Discouraged Ones album, while "Quiet World" was recorded in the same Sunlight Studios 1997 session as Sounds of Decay, and "Scarlet Heavens" was a hard-to-find 1994 recording originally issued on the 1996 Katatonia/Primordial Split 10".

While all of the band's previous efforts utilized  growled vocals almost exclusively, Saw You Drown begins the band's shift towards clean vocals. This release first shows on the album cover the band's changed & second logo, coinciding with the change in sound.

Track listing
"Saw You Drown" – 5:02
"Nerve" – 4:31
"Quiet World" – 4:37
"Scarlet Heavens" – 10:25

Personnel
Katatonia
 Jonas Renkse – lead vocals, drums
 Anders Nyström – guitar; backing vocals & keyboards (tracks 1–3)
 Fredrik Norrman – guitar (1-3)
 Micke Oretoft – bass (1-3)
 Guillaume Le Huche – bass (4)

References

Katatonia EPs
1998 EPs
Avantgarde Music EPs
Albums produced by Dan Swanö